{{DISPLAYTITLE:C17H9NO3}}
The molecular formula C17H9NO3 (molar mass: 275.258 g/mol) may refer to:

 Liriodenine
 3-Nitrobenzanthrone (3-nitro-7H-benz[de]anthracen-7-one)

Molecular formulas